Stereotypes and generalizations about Africa, its inhabitants, and their culture have evolved in the Western world since the years of colonial settlement. The idea of Africa's negative stereotypes come from historical and media interactions. Many of the stereotypes of Africa originate from colonialism, racism and media representation.

Stereotypes by region and time

Colonial era

Europe
Belgian cartoonist Hergé depicted Africans as childlike as in Tintin in the Congo. The French tried to 'civilize' the continent by colonizing it. The Germans viewed themselves as the "master race" in comparison with Africans. Some Italians stereotype Africans as illegal immigrants and beggars. Polish understanding of Africa is informed by media, which tends to focus on negative or dramatic news from the continent. Portuguese viewed ruling Africa as an act of charity. During the 19th century, proponents of scientific racism, such as Josiah C. Nott and George Gliddon promoted racist comparisons between Africans and apes, which they used to promote their racialist ideas of a racial hierarchy and craniometry.

Present day

East Asia
China views itself as a benevolent helper of Africans. In Chinese internet culture, unlucky or incompetent video game players are called 'Africans', a reference to the expression 'black face' to mean unluckiness. Japan views Africa as a continent in need of help. Some Africans in India are perceived negatively. South Koreans view Africa as an undeveloped continent.

United States
In the United States, Africa is viewed as a disease-ridden and backward continent. Africans are viewed to be vulnerable to disease.

A common stereotype of Africa in the United States is that, Africa is mostly populated as a jungle with wild animals. Hollywood has been criticized for disseminating negative stereotype of Africa in movies.

Australia
Australia is considered to be the least exposed region to African culture. Australians view the continent as homogeneous and backwards. African immigrants are typically conflated with African American stereotypes.

Common stereotypes

Environment

The common perception is that much or all of Africa is an inhospitable jungle or desert, or that it is mostly an uninhabited savanna populated mainly by wild animals.

Another mistaken belief about Africa is that wild animals are commonplace and are perceived the way that domestic animals are in Western countries. While many large wild animals are in Africa, they are well known at safaris (especially the lion, leopard, rhinoceros, elephant, and buffalo), many African citizens typically do not see them outside of zoos.

Poverty 
Africa is often believed to be the epicenter of primitive culture and of poverty. Some countries in Africa are impoverished and underdeveloped, but many countries in Africa have thriving and prosperous economies, including Botswana, South Africa, Nigeria, Kenya, Rwanda and Ghana.

Many people falsely believe that Africans live in "mud house[s] in the middle of nowhere". Urban areas in Africa account for 43% of the continent's population, though this is below the global average of 55 percent.

Technology 

Throughout the developed world, Africans are often perceived to have "no access to modern technology"; however, this is inaccurate. A report in 2013 showed that 80 percent of Africans could access a mobile phone. Internet usage across Africa grew by 20% in 2018, with penetration rates across North Africa of 59%, West Africa of 39%, Southern Africa of 51% and East Africa of 45%.

Another common stereotype is that Africans, particularly Nigerians, commit online fraud. The most well-known African scam is the advance-fee scam, nicknamed the "Nigerian prince scam".

Unity
Africa is often mistaken for a single country instead of a continent with 54 independent countries, each of which has its own languages, cultures, traditions, and histories. This misrepresentation leads people to think that all Africans are the same and are without a unique history and culture. The sports media, in particular, often homogenizes Africa in a monolithic and essentialist manner. A common form of such generalization manifests through negative framing and associations of one place to the entire continent.

Similarly, outsiders may believe that there is only one language in Africa, called "African". However, this is not true; in fact, over 2,000 distinct languages and dialects are spoken throughout the African continent. The most common native language used on the African continent is Swahili.

References

Africa
Africa
Africa
Stereotypes of black people